A Ruthless Criticism of Everything Existing is a solo studio album by American hip hop artist Sole. It was released on November 13, 2012. The title derives from a letter written by Karl Marx. A music video was created for "Assad Is Dead".

Critical reception

David Jeffries of AllMusic gave the album 3.5 stars out of 5, saying, "Sole's 2012 effort is more connectable than his early work and worth a listen if alternative observations hold more attraction than easy answers." Chris Martins of Spin called it "his most accessible work since 2003's Selling Live Water." Scott Morrow of Alarm said: "Songs for the revolution have seldom been so danceable, fun, and — dare we say it — pretty."

Alarm included it on the "50 Favorite Albums of 2012" list, while Westword listed it as one of the best local albums of 2012.

Track listing

References

External links
 
 

2012 albums
Sole (hip hop artist) albums
Kickstarter-funded albums
Albums produced by Alias (musician)
Albums produced by Factor (producer)
Albums produced by Ryan Hemsworth